The 34th World Cup season began in October 1999 and concluded at the World Cup finals in March 2000.  The overall winners were Hermann Maier (his second) and Renate Götschl (her first), both of Austria. 

Maier set a new record for total points in one season, with 2000. This was not eclipsed until Tina Maze garnered 2,414 in the 2013 season.

Calendar

Men

Ladies

Men

Overall 

see complete table

Downhill 

see complete table

In Men's Downhill World Cup 1999/2000 the all results count.

Super G 

see complete table

In Men's Super G World Cup 1999/2000 all results count. Hermann Maier won his third Super G World Cup in a row. Austrian athletes won six races out of seven.

Giant Slalom 

see complete table

In Men's Giant Slalom World Cup 1999/2000 all results count. Austrian athletes won eight races out of nine.

Slalom 

see complete table

In Men's Slalom World Cup 1999/2000 the all results count.

Combined 

see complete table

In Men's Combined World Cup 1999/2000 both results count. Kjetil André Aamodt won his fourth Combined World Cup.

Ladies

Overall

Downhill

Super G

Giant Slalom

Slalom

Combined

References

External links
FIS-ski.com - World Cup standings - 2000

FIS Alpine Ski World Cup
World Cup
World Cup